Mikhail Nikolayevich Rumyantsev (10 December 1901 – 31 March 1983), better known under his stage name Karandash ( which means pencil), was a famous Soviet clown. He was a People's Artist of the USSR and a Hero of Socialist Labour, and was the teacher of the famous Russian clowns Oleg Popov and Yuri Nikulin.

Family life
Rumyantsev was born in Saint Petersburg, and had two younger siblings, brother Kostya and sister Lena. His mother died when he was six.

Rumyantsev had at least two daughters.

Career as clown

Starting his career in the circus arena as the imitator of Charlie Chaplin, Mikhail Rumyantsev then abandoned it for, or rather, transformed that part into his would-be renowned image of Karandash always accompanied with his hallmark Scottish Terrier named Klyaksa (which means blot).

He enjoyed immense popularity with the Soviet audience and often gathered full houses all over the country. He had courage to ridicule such topics as religion, alcohol, fascism and even Soviet regime.

Rumyantsev taught his profession to both Oleg Popov and Yuri Nikulin.

During the Second World War, Rumyantsev toured on frontiers and mimicked German soldiers to raise soldiers’ morale.

In 1960, he toured South America with the Moscow Circus on Tsvetnoy Boulevard.

Altogether Karandash had worked in the circus for 55 years, the last time he appeared in the arena was just two weeks prior to his death.

The Moscow Circus School was named after him.

Notes

Literature

External links
 Karandash the Clown, Symbol of Epoch on Circus Arena (Biography)

1901 births
1983 deaths
20th-century Russian male actors
Entertainers from Saint Petersburg
Male actors from Saint Petersburg
Heroes of Socialist Labour
Honored Artists of the RSFSR
People's Artists of the RSFSR
People's Artists of the USSR
Recipients of the Order of Lenin
Recipients of the Order of the Red Banner of Labour
Russian clowns
Russian male film actors
Soviet clowns

Soviet male film actors
Burials at Kuntsevo Cemetery